Włodzimierz Małowiejski (born 17 May 1952) is a Polish football manager.

References

1952 births
Living people
Polish football managers
Wisła Płock managers
Hutnik Warsaw managers
Polonia Warsaw managers
KSZO Ostrowiec Świętokrzyski managers
Podbeskidzie Bielsko-Biała managers
People from Kutno County